Nanticoke is an extinct Algonquian language formerly spoken in Delaware and Maryland, United States.  The same language was spoken by several neighboring tribes, including the Nanticoke, which constituted the paramount chiefdom; the Choptank, the Assateague, and probably also the Piscataway and the Doeg.

Vocabulary 
Nanticoke is sometimes considered a dialect of the Delaware language, but its vocabulary was quite distinct.  This is shown in a few brief glossaries, which are all that survive of the language. One is a 146-word list compiled by Moravian missionary John Heckewelder in 1785, from his interview with a Nanticoke chief then living in Canada. The other is a list of 300 words obtained in 1792 by William Vans Murray, then a US Representative (at the behest of Thomas Jefferson.)  He compiled the list from a Nanticoke speaker in Dorchester County, Maryland, part of the historic homeland.

Nanticoke vocabulary 
These words are some of the listings in Murray's glossary. In the letter that accompanied his glossary, Murray noted that the Nanticoke were "not more than nine in number," and also stated that "they have no word for the personals 'he' and 'she.'" The exclamation point (!) indicates a "peculiar, forcible, explosive, enunciation" of a syllable in this phoneticization.

Modern Nanticoke 
With the assistance of a native speaker, Myrelene Ranville née Henderson of the Sagkeeng First Nation in Manitoba, Canada, who speaks  a similar language, Anishnabay, a group of Nanticoke people in Millsboro, Delaware, assembled to revive the language in 2007, using the vocabulary list of Thomas Jefferson. It had been "more than 150 years since the last conversation in Nanticoke took place."  Similar efforts made by the Nanticoke Indian Association are also being taken through partnership with local linguists.

See also
Piscataway language

Notes

External links
 Custom lexicon: The Interactive ALR – includes all known Nanticoke data
 Native Languages of the Americas: Nanticoke (Southern Delaware)
 Nanticoke Language [archive]
OLAC resources in and about the Nanticoke language

Eastern Algonquian languages
Indigenous languages of the North American eastern woodlands
Native American history of Delaware
Native American history of Maryland
Native American history of Virginia
Native American language revitalization
Extinct languages of North America
Indigenous languages of Maryland
Languages extinct in the 1840s